Victor Ruzo (born 22 December 1913 in Straubenzell; died 26 Märch 2008 in Montreux) was a Swiss painter. His artworks include 'Fine Stockings' and 'Chevaux'.

References

1913 births
2008 deaths
Artists from Zürich
20th-century Swiss painters
Swiss male painters
21st-century Swiss painters
21st-century Swiss male artists
Swiss contemporary artists
20th-century Swiss male artists